Leigh-on-Sea railway station is on the London, Tilbury and Southend line, serving the town of Leigh-on-Sea, Essex. Its three-letter station code is LES.

It was originally opened as Leigh by the London, Tilbury and Southend Railway on 1 July 1855, being renamed Leigh-on-Sea on 1 October 1904, but was rebuilt by the London, Midland and Scottish Railway on a new site,  to the west, opening on 1 January 1934. The station and all trains serving it are currently operated by c2c.

History 

The original station was built in Leigh Old Town and opened in 1855, but a larger three-platform station some distance to the west was opened on 1 January 1934 to replace the first structure. The original building was then used by a local Sea Scout troop until the northern platform buildings were demolished to allow the widening of the adjacent road. The other platform and station building still exist and are currently used by Leigh Sailing Club.

When the London Underground's District line operated a seasonal non-stop excursion service between 1910 and 1939 through to the Southend area, Leigh-on-Sea was the first stop after .

There were formerly sidings on the 'up' London-bound side to the south-west of the station. There was a fatal accident at these sidings on 15 December 1935. The sidings had been partly decommissioned by 1969.

Services 

The typical off-peak service frequency is:
 4tph (trains per hour) westbound towards London Fenchurch Street, of which:
2 tph call at all stations via 
2 tph call at all stations via the  branch

 4 tph eastbound towards , of which:
 2 tph terminate at 
 2 tph continue to Shoeburyness

During peak hours there are additional trains to and from Fenchurch Street, some of which terminate at Leigh-on-Sea.

References

External links 

Railway stations in Essex
DfT Category C2 stations
Railway stations in Southend-on-Sea
Former London, Tilbury and Southend Railway stations
Railway stations in Great Britain opened in 1855
Railway stations in Great Britain opened in 1934
Railway stations in Great Britain closed in 1934
Railway stations served by c2c
Buildings and structures in Southend-on-Sea